ZOS: Zone of Separation is a Canadian television drama mini-series, co-executive produced by Paul Gross. 
It is an eight-part Canadian original drama mini-series about the life and death struggle to enforce a U.N.-brokered ceasefire in the fictional, Sarajevo-like town of Jadac.



Plot
ZOS is a fictional drama that follows Sean Kuzak, a UN military observer along with her co-workers, in a Sarajevo-like setting. It is not actually Sarajevo and it has only two primary factions, Christians and Muslims - though they are not always monolithic in intent. Throughout, the attempts by the U.N. team to maintain the peace are thwarted by both sides, and at times, even the peace-keeping force from the UN. Their own lives are in peril, even as they are attempting to protect the lives of individuals from each party. In some cases, the peacekeepers have to deal with violence directed at them, requiring them to confront their own personal conflicts throughout the series.

ZOS: Zone of Separation aired its first episode on The Movie Network on January 19, 2009 at 10 p.m. ET and on Movie Central at 9 p.m. PT.

Cast and characters
 Michelle Nolden as Sean Kuzak
 Colm Meaney as George Titac
 Lolita Davidovich as Mila Michailov
 Rick Roberts as Maj. Gavin Hart
 Enrico Colantoni as Speedo Boy
 Allan Hawco as Capt. Mick Graham

External links

 
 ZOS: Zone of Separation at The Movie Network
 ZOS: Zone of Separation at IMDb 
 Producer's Website at Whizbang Films

Crave original programming
2009 Canadian television series debuts
2000s Canadian drama television series